Richard Steven Landes (born November 15, 1959) is an American politician. He served in the Virginia House of Delegates from 1996 to 2020, representing the 25th district in the Blue Ridge Mountains, including parts of Albemarle, Augusta and Rockingham Counties. He currently serves as the elected Clerk of the Circuit Court for Augusta County. He is a member of the Republican Party.

Landes served as chairman of the House Education Committee and is the first non-attorney to serve as Chairman and member of the Virginia Code Commission. In 2019, he announced his retirement and intention to run for clerk of court for Augusta County.

Landes was legislative assistant to Delegate Pete Giesen from 1988 to 1992 and district director and representative for U.S. Representative Bob Goodlatte from 1993 to 1995.

Electoral history

References

External links

1959 births
Living people
Republican Party members of the Virginia House of Delegates
Virginia Commonwealth University alumni
People from Augusta County, Virginia
Politicians from Staunton, Virginia
21st-century American politicians